The 1918 Connecticut gubernatorial election was held on November 5, 1918. Incumbent Republican Marcus H. Holcomb defeated Democratic nominee Thomas J. Spellacy with 50.72% of the vote.

General election

Candidates
Major party candidates
Marcus H. Holcomb, Republican
Thomas J. Spellacy, Democratic

Other candidates
Martin F. Plunkett, Socialist
John Newton Lackey, Prohibition
Herman Klawansky, Socialist Labor
George A. Parsons, Independent
Michael Delphia, Independent

Results

References

1918
Connecticut
Gubernatorial